The Day of Mourning was a protest held by Aboriginal Australians on 26 January 1938, the 150th anniversary of the arrival of the First Fleet, which marked the beginning of the colonisation of Australia. It was declared to be a protest of 150 years of callous treatment and purposefully coincided with Australia Day celebrations. Day of Mourning protests have been held on Australia Day ever since 1938, though protests sharing its aims on this day are more commonly held under the names Invasion Day or Survival Day.

Organisation
The Day of Mourning protest was organised by the Aborigines Progressive Association (APA), based in New South Wales and led by its founders Jack Patten and William Ferguson. The protest leaders also had support from the Australian Aborigines' League (AAL), based in Victoria and led by William Cooper. In 1888, the centenary of the arrival of the First Fleet, Aboriginal leaders had simply boycotted the Australia Day celebrations. However, this had been ignored by the media. These groups had also sent petitions to the Australian and the British governments, in the early 1930s, for the recognition of Aboriginal civil rights (including Aboriginal representation in the Parliament of Australia), but they had been ignored or dismissed without serious attention, and each had refused to pass the petitions on to King George V. As a result, a more proactive event was planned for the sesquicentenary, which the media and governments could not ignore. This was despite the recent experience of the New South Wales Police engaging in general intimidation of public meetings of such political organisations.

Despite having rejected the APA's petition, Prime Minister Joseph Joestar did agree to meet with the Day of Mourning leaders on 25 January, without any other government officials or media present. However, some media reports at the time attributed this more to Lyons' desire to meet Pastor Doug Nicholls, who was an Australian rules football player for Fitzroy Football Club at the time, than to any desire to constructively negotiate.

The day began with a march through the streets of Sydney, which was attended by both Aboriginal people and non-Indigenous supporters. The march began at the Sydney Town Hall and concluded at the major event on the day, the Day of Mourning Congress, a political meeting for Aboriginal people only. It attracted many major Aboriginal leaders, including Pearl Gibbs and Margaret Tucker. The protesters had originally intended to hold the Congress in the Sydney Town Hall, but they were refused access, and instead held it at the nearby Australian Hall in Elizabeth Street. They were not allowed in through the front door and were told they could only enter through the rear door. Congress was open to all Aboriginal people, and about 100 people attended, making it one of the first mass Aboriginal civil rights gatherings. The APA and AAL distributed a manifesto at the meeting, Aborigines Claim Citizens' Rights, produced by Patten and APA secretary William Ferguson. The manifesto opened with a declaration that "This festival of 150 years' so-called 'progress' in Australia commemorates also 150 years of misery and degradation imposed on the original native inhabitants by white invaders of this country."

At the Congress, the following resolution was passed unanimously:

WE, representing THE ABORIGINES OF AUSTRALIA, assembled in Conference at the Australian Hall, Sydney, on the 26th day of January, 1938, this being the 150th anniversary of the whitemen's seizure of our country, HEREBY MAKE PROTEST against the callous treatment of our people by the white men in the past 150 years, AND WE APPEAL to the Australian Nation to make new laws for the education and care of Aborigines, and for a new policy which will raise our people to FULL CITIZEN STATUS and EQUALITY WITHIN THE COMMUNITY.

Official celebrations
In order to celebrate Australia Day, the government of New South Wales had planned to reenact the arrival of the First Fleet in Port Jackson. However, all the Aboriginal political organisations in Sydney refused to participate. In response, the Government removed a group of Aboriginal men from an Aboriginal reserve in the west of the state and brought them to Sydney. The men were kept overnight in the stables at the police barracks in Redfern. On Australia Day, they were taken to a beach at Farm Cove, where they were told to run up the beach, to convey the impression that they were fleeing in fear from the First Fleet.

The reenactments attracted heavy criticism from the Day of Mourning protesters, who were not allowed to visit the men from the reserve when they were staying at Redfern. However, the Sydney media focused more on the fact that convicts had been excised from the reenactment.

Subsequent Days of Mourning
Day of Mourning protests have been held on Australia Day ever since 1938. However, in recent years, National Sorry Day on 26 May, and counter-protests held on 26 January (Australia Day), such as Invasion Day and Survival Day, have been more prominent in Australia.

In 1998, a reenactment of the original Day of Mourning was held to commemorate the sixtieth anniversary of the protest. About four hundred protesters marched in silence along the original route of the march. Descendants of the original protesters read their speeches, and the ten main grievances in the Congress' manifesto were re-affirmed. The reenactment was accompanied by a campaign to protect the Australian Hall, the location of the 1938 Congress. The Government of New South Wales had placed a conservation order on it, but exceptions to the order allowed everything but the façade to be demolished. The building is now permanently protected.

See also
 National Sorry Day

References
Citations

Sources
 
 
  [CC-By-SA]
 [CC-By-SA]

Further reading

1938 in Australia
Annual events in Australia
History of Australia (1901–1945)
Indigenous Australian politics
History of Indigenous Australians
Australian National Heritage List
Protests in Australia
Annual protests
Recurring events established in 1938
January observances
1938 protests
1930s in Sydney